Line 2 of the Nanjing Metro is a subway line that runs mainly in an east-west direction on the Nanjing Metro network, running from  to ; it entered operation on May 28, 2010. Of the 26 stations, 17 stations are underground, 2 stations are on the surface, and the other 7 station are either above ground or elevated stations.

Opening timeline

Stations

Transfers to other modes of transportation

Rail
The Zijinshan railway station (紫金山站) of the Huhanrong Passenger Dedicated Line and the Shanghai–Nanjing Intercity High-Speed Railway (on its branch going to the new Nanjing South railway station, rather than the one to the Nanjing railway station) will be located next to Jinmalu station.

Bus

Maqun Bus Station, with services to a few cities east of Nanjing, is located near .

References

External links 
Line 2 on the official Nanjing Metro website (includes route map) 

Nanjing Metro lines
Siemens Mobility projects
Railway lines opened in 2010